Robert Cameron (born 6 September 1938) is an Australian cricketer. He played four first-class matches for South Australia between 1957 and 1959.

See also
 List of South Australian representative cricketers

References

External links
 

1938 births
Living people
Australian cricketers
South Australia cricketers
Cricketers from Adelaide